This is a list of works classified as cyberpunk, a subgenre of science fiction. Cyberpunk is characterized by a focus on "high tech and low life" in a near-future setting.

Print media

Novels and novellas

 Do Androids Dream of Electric Sheep? (1968) by Philip K. Dick
 The Girl Who Was Plugged In (1973) by James Tiptree Jr
 True Names (1981) by Vernor Vinge
 Ware Tetralogy (1982–2000) by Rudy Rucker
 The Sprawl trilogy (Neuromancer (1984), Count Zero (1986), and Mona Lisa Overdrive (1988)) by William Gibson – popularized the concept of cyberspace, exemplifies the genre.
 Dr. Adder (1984) by K. W. Jeter
 Schismatrix (1985) by Bruce Sterling
 Eclipse Trilogy (also known as A Song Called Youth Trilogy) (1985–90) by John Shirley – includes Eclipse (1985), Eclipse Penumbra (1988), and Eclipse Corona (1990)
 Hardwired (1986) by Walter Jon Williams
 Mindplayers (1987) by Pat Cadigan
 The Glass Hammer (1987) by K. W. Jeter
 Voice of the Whirlwind (1987) by Walter Jon Williams
 When Gravity Fails (1987) by George Alec Effinger – part of the Effinger's Marîd Audran series
 Islands in the Net (1988) by Bruce Sterling
 A Fire in the Sun (1989) by George Alec Effinger – part of the Effinger's Marîd Audran series
 "Solip:System" (1989 novelette released as a standalone book) by Walter Jon Williams
 My Cousin, My Gastroenterologist (1990) by Mark Leyner
 The Exile Kiss (1991) by George Alec Effinger – part of the Effinger's Marîd Audran series
 Synners (1991) by Pat Cadigan
 Snow Crash (1992) by Neal Stephenson
 The Bridge trilogy (1993–1999) by William Gibson
 Heavy Weather (1994) by Bruce Sterling
 Trouble and Her Friends (1994) by Melissa Scott
 Blade Runner 2: The Edge of Human, Blade Runner 3: Replicant Night, and Blade Runner 4: Eye and Talon (1995–2000) by K. W. Jeter
 The Diamond Age (1996) by Neal Stephenson
 Holy Fire (1996) by Bruce Sterling
 Night Sky Mine (1997) by Melissa Scott
 Noir (1998) by K. W. Jeter
 Tea from an Empty Cup (1998) by Pat Cadigan
 One of Us (1998) by Michael Marshall Smith
 Altered Carbon (2002) by Richard Morgan
 River of Gods (2004) by Ian McDonald
 Accelerando (2005) by Charles Stross
 Glasshouse (2006)
 Daemon (2006–2010) by Daniel Suarez
 Little Brother (2008) by Cory Doctorow
 The Mirrored Heavens (2008) by David J. Williams
 Ready Player One (2011) by Ernest Cline
 Bleeding Edge (2013) by Thomas Pynchon
 Blackstar (2013–2015) by Josh Viola
 Cash Crash Jubilee (2015) by Eli K.P. William
 The Naked World (2017)

Short stories, anthologies, and single-author collections
 Cyberpunk (1983) by Bruce Bethke
 Burning Chrome (1986) by William Gibson
 Mirrorshades: The Cyberpunk Anthology (1986) edited by Bruce Sterling
 Patterns (1989) by Pat Cadigan
 Crystal Express (1989) by Bruce Sterling
 Storming the Reality Studio: A Casebook of Cyberpunk & Postmodern Science Fiction (1992) edited by Larry McCaffery (contains both fiction and nonfiction)
 Hackers (1996) by Jack Dann & Gardner Dozois
 Dragonfire: A Cyberpunk Short Story Collection (2021) by Robert J. Cunningham

Graphic novels and comics

 Judge Dredd (1977–) by John Wagner and Carlos Ezquerra
 The Incal (1981–1989) by Alejandro Jodorowsky
 Akira (1982–1990) by Katsuhiro Ōtomo
 Black Magic (1983) by Masamune Shirow
 Ronin (1983–1984) by Frank Miller
 Shatter (1985–1988) by Peter B. Gillis and Mike Saenz
 Appleseed (1985–1989) by Masamune Shirow
 Dominion (1986) by Masamune Shirow
 Ghost in the Shell (1989–1991) by Masamune Shirow
 Neuromancer (1989) by Tom de Haven and Bruce Jensen
 Battle Angel Alita (1990–1995) by Yukito Kishiro
 Martha Washington (1990–1991) by Frank Miller and Dave Gibbons
 Barb Wire (1994–1995) by Chris Warner
 Transmetropolitan (1997–2002) by Warren Ellis
 Eden: It's an Endless World! (1998–2008) by Hiroki Endo
 Blame! (1998) by Tsutomu Nihei
 NOiSE (2001) – prequel to Blame!
 Biomega (2007)
 Singularity 7 (2004) by Ben Templesmith
 The Surrogates (2005) by Robert Venditti
 The entire Marvel 2099 line is an example of the cyberpunk genre in comics, especially Ghost Rider 2099 and Spider-Man 2099.
 Marvel's Machine Man Vol. 2
 Batman Beyond
 The True Lives of the Fabulous Killjoys (2013-2014) by Gerard Way and Shaun Simon

Magazines and journals
 Mondo 2000
 Ctheory (1996–)
 Cheval Noir (1989–1994)

Audiovisual media

Films
Most of the films listed are cyberpunk-related either through narrative or by thematic context. Films released before 1982 should be seen as precursors to the genre. Animated films are listed separately in the Animation section below.

 Escape from New York (1981)
 Burst City (1982)
 Tron (1982)
 Blade Runner (1982)
 Brainstorm (1983)
 Videodrome (1983)
 Repo Man (1984)
 The Terminator (1984)
 Brazil (1985)
 RoboCop (1987)
 The Running Man (1987)
 Gunhed (1989)
 Tetsuo: The Iron Man (1989)
 Circuitry Man (1990)
 RoboCop 2 (1990)
 Hardware (a.k.a. M.A.R.K. 13) (1990)
 Megaville (1990)
 Total Recall (1990)
 Terminator 2: Judgment Day (1991)
 964 Pinocchio (1991)
 Until the End of the World (1991)
 Nemesis (1992)
 Freejack (1992)
 The Lawnmower Man (1992)
 Tetsuo II: Body Hammer (1992)
 Cyborg 2 (1993)
 Demolition Man (1993)
 RoboCop 3 (1993)
 Robot Wars (1993)
 Plughead Rewired: Circuitry Man II (1994)
 Death Machine (1994)
 Hackers (1995)
 Johnny Mnemonic (1995)
 Judge Dredd (1995)
 Strange Days (1995)
 Virtuosity (1995)
 Escape from L.A. (1996)
 The Lawnmower Man 2: Beyond Cyberspace (1996)
 Deathline (a.k.a. Redline) (1997)
 The Fifth Element (1997)
 Nirvana (1997)
 Andromedia (1998)
 New Rose Hotel (1998)
 Pi (1998)
 Skyggen (a.k.a. Webmaster) (1998)
 Dark City (1998)
 eXistenZ (1999)
 The Thirteenth Floor (1999)
 Bicentennial Man (1999)
 The Matrix (1999)
 I.K.U. (2000)
 The 6th Day (2000)
 Avalon (2001)
 A.I. Artificial Intelligence (2001)
 Electric Dragon 80.000 V (2001)
 Cypher (2002)
 Dead or Alive: Final (2002)
 Impostor (2002)
 Minority Report (2002)
 Resurrection of the Little Match Girl (2002)
 All Tomorrow's Parties (2003)
 Code 46 (2003)
 The Matrix Reloaded (2003)
 The Matrix Revolutions (2003)
 Natural City (2003)
 Paycheck (2003)
 Avatar (a.k.a. Cyber Wars) (2004)
 Immortal (2004)
 I, Robot (2004)
 Paranoia 1.0 (a.k.a. One Point 0) (2004)
 Æon Flux (2005)
 Children of Men (2006)
 Ultraviolet (2006)
 Chrysalis (2007)
 Eden Log (2007)
 The Gene Generation (2007)
 Babylon A.D. (2008)
 Sleep Dealer (2008)
 Tokyo Gore Police (2008)
 District 9 (2009)
 Hardwired (2009)
 Surrogates (2009)
 Tetsuo: The Bullet Man (2009)
 Tron: Legacy (2010)
 Repo Men (2010)
 Priest (2011)
 Dredd (2012)
 Total Recall  (2012)
 Elysium (2013)
 The Zero Theorem (2013)
 Automata (2014)
 Transcendence (2014)
 RoboCop (2014)
 Chappie (2015)
 Ex Machina (2015)
 Hardcore Henry (2015)
 Ghost in the Shell (2017)
 Bleeding Steel (2017)
 Blade Runner 2049 (2017)
 Ready Player One (2018)
 Upgrade (2018)
 Hotel Artemis (2018)
 Anon (2018)
 Alita: Battle Angel (2019)
 Reminiscence (2021)
 Jung E (2023)

Animation

 Megazone 23 (1985)
 Neo Tokyo (1986)
 Black Magic M-66 (1987)
 Bubblegum Crisis (1987)
 Bubblegum Crisis Tokyo 2040 (1998)
 Akira (1988)
 RoboCop: The Animated Series (1988)
 Beast Machines: Transformers (1999–2000)
 Dominion
 Dominion (1988–1989)
 New Dominion Tank Police (1993–1994)
 Tank Police Team: Tank S.W.A.T. 01 (2006)
 Appleseed
 Appleseed (1988 film)
 Appleseed (2004 film)
 Appleseed Ex Machina (2007 film)
 Appleseed XIII (2011)
 Appleseed Alpha (2014 film)
 A.D. Police Files (1990)
 Cyber City Oedo 808 (1990)
 Æon Flux (1991–1995)
 Silent Möbius (1991–2003)
 Genocyber (1993)
 Macross Plus (1994)
 Armitage III (1995)
 Ghost in the Shell (anime films) Ghost in the Shell (1995 film)
 Ghost in the Shell 2: Innocence (2004 film)
 Ghost in the Shell: Stand Alone Complex (S.A.C.)
 Ghost in the Shell: Stand Alone Complex (S.A.C.) (2002–2003)
 Ghost in the Shell: S.A.C. 2nd GIG (2004–2005)
 Ghost in the Shell: Stand Alone Complex - Solid State Society (2006 film)
 Ghost in the Shell: SAC 2045 (2020–2022)
 Ghost in the Shell: Arise
 Ghost in the Shell: Arise (2013–2015)
 Ghost in the Shell: The New Movie (2016 film)
 Spicy City (1997)
 Cowboy Bebop (1998)
 RoboCop: Alpha Commando (1998–1999)
 Serial Experiments Lain (1998)
 Gundress (1999)
 Batman Beyond (1999–2001)
 Metropolis (2001)
 The Animatrix (2003)
 Code Lyoko (2003–2007)
 Heat Guy J (2003)
 Parasite Dolls (2003)
 Texhnolyze (2003)
 Wonderful Days (a.k.a. Sky Blue) (2003)
 Burst Angel (2004)
 Fragile Machine (2005)
 Aachi & Ssipak (2006)
 A Scanner Darkly (2006)
 Ergo Proxy (2006)
 Paprika (2006)
 Renaissance (2006)
 Dennō Coil (2007)
 Vexille (2007)
 Technotise: Edit & I (2009, Serbia)
 Real Drive (2008)
 Mardock Scramble (2010)
 Accel World (2012–2016)
 Psycho-Pass (2012)
 Tron: Uprising (2012)
 Dimension W (2016)
 No Guns Life (2019–2020)
 Altered Carbon: Resleeved (2020)
 Akudama Drive (2020)
 Blade Runner: Black Lotus (2021–2022)
 Cyberpunk: Edgerunners (2022)

Television and web series

 World on a Wire (1973)
 The Deadly Assassin (1976)
 Overdrawn at the Memory Bank (1983)
 Max Headroom: 20 Minutes into the Future (1985), British television movie
 Max Headroom (1987), American television series based on the UK TV movie
 Wild Palms (1993)
 TekWar (1994)
 RoboCop: The Series (1994)
 VR.5 (1996)
 Welcome to Paradox (1998)
 The X-Files, two episodes of the series were written by William Gibson and contain cyberpunk themes:
 Kill Switch (1998)
 First Person Shooter (2000)
 Harsh Realm (1999)
 Total Recall 2070 (1999)
 Dark Angel (2000–2002)
 RoboCop: Prime Directives (2001)
 Charlie Jade (2005)
 Terminator: The Sarah Connor Chronicles (2008–2009)
 Power Rangers RPM (2009)
 Kamen Rider Dragon Knight (2009)
 Dollhouse (2009–2010)
 Caprica (2010)
 Person of Interest (2011–2016)
 Black Mirror (2011–2019)
 Continuum (2012–2015), set in the present with a protagonist who has time traveled back from a cyberpunk future in 2077
 H+: The Digital Series (2012)
 Almost Human (2013–2014)
 Die Gstettensaga: The Rise of Echsenfriedl (2014)
 Mr. Robot (2015–2019)
 Humans (2015–2018)
 Westworld (2016–2022)
 Incorporated (2016–2017)
 Altered Carbon (2018–2020)
 S'parta (2018)
 Better Than Us (2018–2019)
 Love, Death & Robots (2019–present)
 Meta Runner (2019–2022)
 Onisciente (2020)
 Upload (2020–present)

Sculpture
Artists
 Asher

Music
 Blade Runner by Vangelis
 Cyberpunk by Billy Idol
 Drezden by Drezden
 Introducing Neals by YTCracker
 Outside by David Bowie
 Transverse City by Warren Zevon
 Year Zero by Nine Inch Nails
 新しい日の誕生  by 2814
 Když láska schází by Iveta Bartošová and Ladislav Štaidl group (1988)

Video games

 The Screamer (1985)
 Imitation City (1987)
 Megami Tensei series (1987–present)
 Digital Devil Story: Megami Tensei (1987)
 Devil Summoner: Soul Hackers (1997)
 Shin Megami Tensei: Digital Devil Saga (2004)
 Shin Megami Tensei IV (2013)
 Soul Hackers 2 (2022)
 Metal Gear series (1987–present)
 Metal Gear Solid (1998)
 Metal Gear Solid 2: Sons of Liberty (2001)
 Metal Gear Solid 4: Guns of the Patriots (2008)
 Metal Gear Rising Revengeance (2013)
 Akira (19882002)
 Akira (1988)
 Akira Psycho Ball (2002)
 Neuromancer (1988)
 Snatcher (1988–1996)
 Genocide (1989)
 Night Striker (1989)
 DreamWeb (1992)
 Flashback (1992)
 BloodNet (1993)
 Gadget: Invention, Travel, & Adventure (1993)
 Shadowrun series
 Shadowrun (SNES) (1993)
 Shadowrun (Sega Genesis) (1994)
 Shadowrun (Sega CD) (1996)
 Shadowrun (2007)
 Shadowrun Returns (2013) 
 Shadowrun: Dragonfall (2014) 
 Shadowrun Chronicles: Boston Lockdown (2015)
 Shadowrun: Hong Kong (2015) 
 Syndicate series
 Syndicate (1993)
 Syndicate Wars (1996)
 Syndicate (2012)
 Beneath a Steel Sky (1994)
 Burn:Cycle (1994)
 Hell: A Cyberpunk Thriller (1994)
 Delta V (1994)
 Hagane: The Final Conflict (1994)
 Live A Live (1994)
 Rise of the Robots (1994) 
 Policenauts (1994)
 Appleseed series
 Appleseed: Oracle of Prometheus (1994)
 Appleseed EX (2004)
 System Shock series
 System Shock (1994)
 System Shock 2 (1999)
 CyberMage: Darklight Awakening (1995)
 Johnny Mnemonic: The Interactive Action Movie (1995)
 Road Rage (1995)
 Osman (1996)
 Blade Runner (1997)
 Final Fantasy VII (1997)
 Compilation of Final Fantasy VII (20042009)
 Final Fantasy VII Remake (2020)
 Ghost in the Shell (1997)
 Einhänder (1998)
 Nightlong: Union City Conspiracy (1998)
 Xenogears (1998)
 The Nomad Soul (1999)
 Fear Effect series
 Fear Effect (2000)
 Fear Effect 2: Retro Helix (2001)
 Fear Effect Sedna (2018)
 Deus Ex series
 Deus Ex (2000)
 Deus Ex: Invisible War (2003) 
 Deus Ex: Human Revolution (2011) 
 Deus Ex: The Fall (2013)
 Deus Ex: Mankind Divided (2016)
 Perfect Dark series
 Perfect Dark (2000)
 Perfect Dark Zero (2005)
 Oni (2001)
 Anachronox (2001)
 Mega Man Battle Network series
 Mega Man Battle Network (2001)
 Mega Man Battle Network 2 (2001)
 Mega Man Battle Network 3 (2002)
 Mega Man Network Transmission (2003)
 Mega Man Battle Chip Challenge (2003)
 Mega Man Battle Network 4 (2003)
 Mega Man Battle Network 5 (2004)
 Mega Man Battle Network 6 (2005)
 Uplink (2001)
 Breath of Fire: Dragon Quarter (2002)
 .hack series
 .hack//IMOQ (2002–2003)
 .hack//G.U. (2006–2007)
 .hack//Link (2010)
 Neocron (2002)
 Enter the Matrix (2003)
 P.N.03 (2003)
 Cy Girls (2004)
 Æon Flux (2005)
 Dystopia (2005)
 System Rush (2005)
 Mirror's Edge (2008)
 Halo 3: ODST (2009)
 Cyber Knights series:
 Cyber Knights (Classic) (2011)
 Cyber Knights: Flashpoint (2021)
 Gemini Rue (2011)
 Hard Reset (2011)
 Cypher (2012)
 Cataclysm: Dark Days Ahead (2013)
 Remember Me (2013)
 Far Cry 3: Blood Dragon (2013)
 Alien: Isolation (2014)
 Jazzpunk (2014)
 Transistor (2014)
 Watch Dogs series:
 Watch Dogs (2014)
 Watch Dogs 2 (2016)
 Watch Dogs: Legion (2020)
 2064: Read Only Memories (2015)
 Call of Duty: Black Ops III (2015)
 Dex (2015)
 Technobabylon (2015)
 Soma (2015)
 Satellite Reign (2015)
 Digimon Story: Cyber Sleuth (2015)
 Invisible, Inc. (2016)
 Mirror's Edge Catalyst (2016)
 Superhot (2016)
 VA-11 HALL-A (2016)
 Digimon Story: Cyber Sleuth – Hacker's Memory (2017)
 Observer (2017)
 Ruiner (2017)
 The Red Strings Club (2018)
 Ion Fury (2018)
 Tales of the Neon Sea (2018)
 Astral Chain (2019)
 Katana Zero (2019)
 Dohna Dohna (2020)
 Cyberpunk 2077 (2020)
 Ghostrunner (2020)
 Incredibox
 V8: Dystopia (2020)
 Cloudpunk (2020)
 ENCODYA (2021)
 The Ascent (2021)
 Stray (2022)
 SIGNALIS (2022)
 The Last Night (TBA)

Tabletop games
 Cyberpunk (1988)
 Cyberpunk 2020 (1990)
 Cyberpunk V3.0 (2005)
 Cyberpunk Red (2020)
 Shadowrun (1989)
 GURPS Cyberpunk (1990)
 Necromunda (1995)
 Infinity (2005)
 Corporation (2009)
 Deadzone (2013)
 Carbon 2185 A Cyberpunk RPG (2019)

Related nonfiction
 A Cyborg Manifesto (1991), by Donna Haraway
 Storming the Reality Studio: A Casebook of Cyberpunk & Postmodern Science Fiction (1992), edited by Larry McCaffery (contains both fiction and nonfiction)
 No Maps for These Territories (2000), documentary about William Gibson

See also
 Cyberpunk derivatives
 Japanese cyberpunk
 List of films about computers
 List of biopunk works
 List of steampunk works
 Tech noir

References

External links
 Cyberpunk Review- Detailed reviews and screencaps for all cyberpunk films and anime 
 Cyberpunk Information Database - Original resource material from The Cyberpunk Project

 
Cyberpunk Works